Clongeen is a village and civil parish in County Wexford, Ireland. The population was 267 at the 2016 census. The village's Catholic church, St Aidan's (or Edan's), was completed in 1839. Clongeen GAA Club competes in football and camogie.

References

Towns and villages in County Wexford
Civil parishes of County Wexford